Nucleolaria is a genus of gastropods belonging to the family Cypraeidae.

The species of this genus are found in Southern Hemisphere.

Species:

Nucleolaria cassiaui 
Nucleolaria cowlitziana 
Nucleolaria granulata 
Nucleolaria nucleus 
Staphylaea soloensis

References

Cypraeidae